Bagh-e Rezvan Cemetery is the biggest cemetery in Isfahan, Iran.

It is at 12 kilometers east of Isfahan.

References 

1970 establishments in Iran
Isfahan
Cemeteries in Isfahan